Something of Time is a studio album by Nightnoise. The album was released by Windham Hill Records (WD-1057) in 1987.

Track listing 

 "Timewinds" by Billy Oskay (3:47)
 "Perchance to Dream" (Billy Oskay, Mícheál Ó Domhnaill) – 4:56
 "The Erebus and the Terror" (M. Ó Domhnaill) – 4:34
 "On the Deep" (M. Ó Domhnaill) – (4:05)
 "Hourglass" (M. Ó Domhnaill) – (6:05)
 "Shadows on a Dancefloor" (M. Ó Domhnaill) – (3:53)
 "Wiggy Wiggy" (M. Ó Domhnaill) – (4:22)
 "Tundra Summer" (Oskay) – (4:49)
 "Aprés-Midi" (Tríona Ní Dhomhnaill) – (3:54)
 "Something of Time" (M. Ó Domhnaill) – (3:04)
 "Toys Not Ties" (Brian Dunning) – (3:59)
 "I Still Remember" (Oskay) – (3:45) [CD bonus track]
 "One for the Lad" (M. Ó Domhnaill) – (4:12) [CD bonus track]

Credits 

 Billy Oskay – violin, viola, piano, harmonium, producer, engineer, mixing, digital editing and assembly
 Mícheál Ó Domhnaill – guitar, whistle, piano, harmonium, synthesizer, vocals, producer
 Tríona Ní Dhomhnaill – harmonium, harpsichord, synthesizer
 Brian Dunning – flute, alto flute, panpipes
 Stewart Whitmore – digital editing and assembly
 Bernie Grundman – mastering
 Ian Matthews – mixing
 Howard Johnston – mixing
 John F. Cooper – photography
 Anne Robinson – design

Notes 
Recorded at Nightnoise Studio, Portland, Oregon in 1985 and 1986.

Track 7 is called "Wiggy Wiggy" A State Of Being on the LP sleeve back, but only the liner notes on the CD release.

Track 11 is called "Toys Not Ties" An Adult's Lament on the LP sleeve back, but only the liner notes on the CD release.

Track 12 is called "One For The Lad" For Tich Richardson R.I.P. in the liner notes only. Tich Richardson was a member of Boys of the Lough. He died in an auto accident in Scotland in 1984.

References 

1987 albums
Nightnoise albums